The O2 Academy Glasgow (formerly the Carling Academy Glasgow) is a music venue on Eglinton Street in the Gorbals (Laurieston) area of Glasgow. It holds 2,500 people. It was one of two Academy Music Group venues in Glasgow, until the O2 ABC Glasgow closed due to fire damage in 2018. 

It was one of a group of music venues in Britain branded Carling Academy, the best known including the Brixton Academy and the O2 Academy Birmingham. Since November 2008, the venue has been rebranded by network operator O2 to its new name, following a new sponsorship deal with Live Nation.

History
The venue is housed in the former New Bedford Cinema which underwent a £3 million refurbishment project to turn it into a 2,500 person music venue. The venue opened on 26 March 2003 with the band Deacon Blue, Singer Bryan Ferry and girl group Sugababes after 10 years of the building being closed and in disrepair.

On 6 November 2008, it was announced that Telefónica Europe (owners of the O2 Network in the UK) had become the new sponsor of all Academy venues, in a deal with music promoter Live Nation. The deal, which lasts for five years, sees all venues rebranded "The O2 Academy", in line with Telefónica's purchase of the Millennium Dome (now The O2).

Events
Previous Events:
The Killers' 2006 gig at the venue sold out in a record three minutes. This led to the band announcing a date at Glasgow's SECC Arena the following night.
James Brown played his last UK gig at the venue on 25 October 2006.
The venue hosted a prestigious O2 Wireless Festival workshop on 10 May 2008.
During the annual Glasgow International Comedy Festival, the venue is transformed into a comedy club with shows taking place every night. Russell Brand, Jimmy Carr and Frankie Boyle have performed at the venue.
The venue played host to The Gigantour on 19 February 2008.
Frankie Boyle hosts the record for the most shows played at the venue - a total of 14 - including six during 2008's Glasgow Comedy Festival.

References

Music venues in Glasgow
Academy Glasgow
Music venues in Scotland
Gorbals